Eastern Armenia in the Last Decades of Persian Rule, 1807–1828: A Political and Socioeconomic Study of the Khanate of Erevan on the Eve of the Russian Conquest is a book by George Bournoutian about the history of Eastern Armenia during the final few decades of Iranian i.e. Persian rule. The book focusses on the Erivan Khanate (i.e. province) of Qajar Iran.

Further reading
 1984 review by David Marshall Lang in Bulletin of the School of Oriental and African Studies
 1984 review by Abbas Amanat in Middle East Journal
 1984 review by Rudi Paul Linder in Iranian Studies
 1984 review by M. E. Yap in The Journal of the Royal Asiatic Society of Great Britain and Ireland
 1985 review by D. S. M. Williams in Slavonic and East European Review
 1986 review by Bert G. Fragner in Die Welt des Islams

1982 non-fiction books
Erivan Khanate
Qajar Iran
History books about Iran
History books about Armenia